Vahur Kersna (also Vahur-Üllar Kersna; born on 4 February 1962) is an Estonian journalist, radio and television personality and caricaturist.

In 1985, he graduated from Tartu State University in journalism.

1986–2007, he was the host for many morning programs on Vikerraadio.

He has led several popular television programs, e.g. Pealtnägija

Awards
 2004 Kuldmikrofon ('Golden Microphone')
 2020 Order of the White Star, IV Class.

References

Living people
1962 births
Estonian journalists
Estonian television personalities
Estonian radio personalities
Estonian caricaturists
Recipients of the Order of the White Star, 4th Class
University of Tartu alumni
People from Võru